2004 Doğubayazıt earthquake was a 5.1 Mw or 5.2 Mw earthquake that rocked Doğubayazıt, Ağrı, Turkey on 2 July 2004 at 01.30 local time. Eighteen people were killed and 32 were injured.

The greatest damage was at Yığınçal village, while Kutlubulak and Sağlıksuyu villages were also affected. Kandilli Observatory stated that around 1000 buildings were damaged. The earthquake was felt from Ağrı, Iğdır, Kars, and areas near Iran-Turkey border. The intensity of the shock was reported as VII, while the depth was reported as 5 km. The earthquake happened during the local mountain pasture season where villagers were in the mountains, which prevented a higher number of casualties. Various organizations sent relief to the area. Three ministers of Turkish government visited the area, Greece offered help and France sent messages of solidarity.

See also 
List of earthquakes in 2004
List of earthquakes in Turkey
1976 Caldiran-Muradiye earthquake

References 

2004 disasters in Turkey
2004 Doğubayazıt
2004 earthquakes
2004 in Turkey